Bommana Brothers Chandana Sisters is a 2008 Telugu comedy drama film directed by Srinivasa Reddy starring Allari Naresh, Krishna Bhagavaan, Farjana, Charulatha, Raghu Babu, Suman Shetty and Kota Srinivasa Rao in the lead roles. Ammiraju Kanumilli produced this film on Siri Cinema Banner while M. M. Srilekha scored the music. The movie was released on 18 April 2008.

Plot
The Bommana brothers and their parents are thieves. Once, these Bommana Brothers rob a bank manager. Eventually they get caught by the police and escape from the police too with the help of their father. Then, they accidentally look at the photograph of two sisters and gather information about them. They are Siri Chandana and Mani Chandana, the daughters of Mohan Rao, the owner of popular cloth business chain.

Siri is faithful to God, while Mani always extends her helping hand to orphans and challenged. The brothers change their attires and dupe both Mani and Siri and win their hearts. After a few twists, the brothers marry the Chandana sisters. Later, the brothers play some more tricks and bequeath the property of their father-in-law. However, Mohana Rao discovers that they are cheats and became a madman. This irks Mani and Siri, who meet a professional killer to murder their husbands. Before that, the brothers realize their mistake and try to reach the sisters to hand over the documents. After a fight with all the villains, the brothers hand over those documents and regain their faith. The movie ends with Mohan Rao entering sound mind and the brothers leading an honest life.

Cast
 Allari Naresh and Krishna Bhagavaan as Ramachandran and Tulasi Ram (the Bommana brothers)
 Farjana and Charulatha as Siri Chandana and Mani Chandana (the Chandana sisters)
 Tanikella Bharani and Kovai Sarala as the Bommana brothers' parents
 Kota Srinivasa Rao as Mohan Rao
 Rajitha as Kanakam
 Dharmavarapu Subramanyam as Bank manager
 Raghu Babu as Professional killer
 Suman Setty as Servant
 Satyam Rajesh as Satyam

Reception
The movie got positive reviews. CineGoer.com gave a review of rating 3/5 stating "Pucca Comedy, Paisa Vasool for a number of reasons but just as highly forgettable. It really does beat the heat and the time flies by quickly till it gets to a done-to-death climax." Sify.com gave a review stating "This is a mass entertainer without any boring elements. Comedy is the lifeline of the film and Srinivasa Reddy succeeded in giving a good treat. Stretched out screenplay and dramatic narration are minus points. It can pass off just as an average film." IndiaGlitz gave a review stating "Naresh and Krishna Bhagawan competed with each other in performance. Farzana and Rithima filled the glamour slot. However, the director unnecessarily dragged certain scenes beyond the limit and tested the patience of the audiences."

Soundtrack

The Music was composed by M. M. Srilekha and all lyrics were penned by Bhaskarabhatla.

References

External links
 

2008 films
2000s Telugu-language films
Indian romantic comedy films
Films shot in Hyderabad, India